Doto africoronata is a species of small sea slug or nudibranch, a shell-less marine gastropod mollusc in the family Dotidae.

Distribution
This species is known from around the South African coast where it is found from the Atlantic coast to Knysna. It is known from the intertidal to more than 25 m.

Description
This species is a small (up to 15 mm) nudibranch, with grape-bunch-like clusters of cerata extending in pairs along the sides of the body. In all Doto the rhinophores extend from cup-like sheaths. Doto africoronata is translucent white in colour with mottling of dark red on the back and sides of the body. The ceratal tubercles are tipped with round red spots.

References

Endemic fauna of South Africa
Dotidae
Gastropods described in 2015